Nathaniel Field may refer to:
 Nathaniel Field, printer, often confused with his brother Nathan Field (1587–1620) English dramatist and actor
 Nathaniel Field (Adventist) (1805–1887) Indiana doctor, abolitionist and Adventist preacher